Sir Karl William Pamp Jenkins  (born 17 February 1944) is a Welsh multi-instrumentalist and composer. His best known works include the song "Adiemus" and the Adiemus album series; Palladio; The Armed Man; and his Requiem.

Jenkins was educated in music at Cardiff University and the Royal Academy of Music: of the latter, he is a fellow and an Associate. He joined the jazz-rock band Soft Machine in 1972 and became the group's lead songwriter in 1974. Jenkins continued to work with Soft Machine up to 1984, but has not been involved with any incarnation of the group since. Jenkins has composed music for advertisement campaigns and has won the industry prize twice.

Early life and education

Karl Jenkins was born and raised in Penclawdd, Gower, Wales. His mother was Swedish, and his father was Welsh. Jenkins received his initial musical instruction from his father, who was the local schoolteacher, chapel organist and choirmaster. He attended Gowerton Grammar School.

Jenkins studied music at Cardiff University, and then commenced postgraduate studies in London at the Royal Academy of Music.

Career overview

Early career: Graham Collier's group and Nucleus
For the bulk of his early career Jenkins was known as a jazz and jazz-rock musician, playing baritone and soprano saxophones, keyboards and oboe, an unusual instrument in a jazz context. He joined jazz composer Graham Collier's group and later co-founded the jazz-rock group Nucleus, which won first prize at the Montreux Jazz Festival in 1970.

Soft Machine
In 1972 he joined the Canterbury progressive rock band Soft Machine. The group played venues including The Proms, Carnegie Hall, and the Newport Jazz Festival. The album Six, on which Jenkins first played with Soft Machine, won the Melody Maker British Jazz Album of the Year award in 1973. Jenkins also won the miscellaneous musical instrument section (as he did the following year). Soft Machine was voted best small group in the Melody Maker jazz poll of 1974. The albums in which Jenkins performed and composed were Six, Seven (1973), Bundles (1975), Softs (1976) and Land of Cockayne (1981). Jenkins composed most of the tracks on Seven and nearly all of the tracks on the subsequent three albums.

After Mike Ratledge left the band in 1976, Soft Machine did not include any of its founding members, but kept recording on a project basis with line-ups revolving around Jenkins and drummer John Marshall. Although Melody Maker had positively reviewed the Soft Machine of 1973 and 1974, Hugh Hopper, involved with the group since replacing bassist Kevin Ayers in 1968, cited Jenkins's "third rate" musical involvement in his own decision to leave the band, and the band of the late 1970s has been described by band member John Etheridge as wasting its potential.

Other works
In November 1973, Jenkins and Ratledge participated in a live-in-the-studio performance of Mike Oldfield's Tubular Bells for the BBC. It is available on Oldfield's Elements DVD.

Jenkins has created advertising music, twice winning the industry prize in that field. From the 1980s, he developed a relationship with Bartle Bogle Hegarty, starting with composing musics for their Levi's jeans "Russian" series. He composed a classical theme used by De Beers diamond merchants for their television advertising campaign focusing on jewellery worn by people otherwise seen only in silhouette. Jenkins later included this as the title track in a compilation called Diamond Music, and eventually created Palladio, using it as the theme of the first movement. Other arrangements have included advertisements for the Renault Clio.

As a composer, his breakthrough came with the crossover project Adiemus. Jenkins has conducted the Adiemus project in Japan, Germany, Spain, Finland, the Netherlands, and Belgium, as well as London's Royal Albert Hall and Battersea Power Station. The Adiemus: Songs of Sanctuary (1995) album topped the classical album charts. It spawned a series of successors, each revolving around a central theme. In 2014 Jenkins released a tribute song for the 2014 Winter Olympics, performed by his new age music group also called Adiemus.

Jenkins was the first international composer and conductor to conduct the University of Johannesburg Kingsway Choir led by Renette Bouwer, during his visit to South Africa as the choir performed his The Armed Man: A mass for peace together with a 70-piece orchestra.

Jenkins' choral work The Peacemakers was first performed in New York City's Carnegie Hall on 16 January 2012. Jenkins conducted from the podium. The seventeen-movement piece features extracts from religious texts and works by notable humanitarians. A recording was released on 26 March 2012; it features the London Symphony Orchestra and several choirs, as well as guest vocalists and instrumentalists. Additional concerts in the UK and US took place later in the year.

 The lyrics was written by a 19th Century great Hungarian Poet: Arany Janos, titled "A Walesi Bardok". The album cover is reflecting the Hungarian Title and the name of the Poet. 
Jenkins composed the music for the 2012 BBC Wales series The Story of Wales presented by Huw Edwards.

A work entitled The Healer – A Cantata For St Luke was premiered on 16 October 2014 (7:30 pm) in St Luke's Church, Grayshott, Hampshire, and was recorded and broadcast on Classic FM. The Healer received its US premiere at Carnegie Hall, New York on 19 January 2015.  In September 2015, the recording of the premiere of The Healer was released on CD by Warner Classics as part of the 8-disc boxed set Voices.

A compilation CD Still with the Music was also released in September 2015, coinciding with the publication of his autobiography of the same name.

On 8 October 2016 Jenkins' choral work Cantata Memoria: For the children, a response to the 1966 Aberfan disaster with a libretto by Mererid Hopwood and commissioned by S4C, premiered at the Wales Millennium Centre. The concert was broadcast the following evening on S4C and was released as an album by Deutsche Grammophon.

Musical style

Lyrics
Many of the songs written by Jenkins have specifically-written phonetic lyrics, but they are not in any language. Instead, they are syllables intended to have a musical effect, but not to carry any specific meaning. This glossolalia is similar to the sounds of "scat singing", except that this latter artform sometimes emphasises of-the-moment improvisation as well.

The composer has said the lyrics to his "Adiemus" series of songs are in "an invented language", and have no particular meaning. He has observed, "The text was written phonetically with the words viewed as instrumental sound, the idea being to maximise the melisma by removing the distraction, if one can call it that, of words”. Some listeners compare his lyrics to the Latin language, but other critics discount such a connection.

Other songs he has written use Biblical or literary texts for the lyrics.

Awards and achievements
Jenkins holds a Doctorate in Music from the University of Wales. He has been made both a fellow and an associate of the Royal Academy of Music, and a room has been named in his honour. He also has had fellowships at Cardiff University (2005), the Royal Welsh College of Music & Drama, Trinity College Carmarthen, and Swansea Metropolitan University.

In 2008 Jenkins' The Armed Man was listed as No. 1 in Classic FM's "Top 10 by living composers".

He was awarded an honorary doctorate in music from the University of Leicester, the Chancellor's Medal from the University of Glamorgan and honorary visiting professorships at Thames Valley University, London College of Music and the ATriUM, Cardiff.

Jenkins was appointed an Officer of the Order of the British Empire (OBE) in the 2005 New Year Honours and a Commander of the Order of the British Empire (CBE) in the 2010 Birthday Honours. In 2015 he was made a Knight Bachelor.

Jenkins is joint president of the British Double Reed Society and Patron of the International Schools Choral Music Society (ISCMS).

In 2016 Jenkins received the BASCA Gold Badge Award for his unique contribution to music.

Discography

With Graham Collier 
 The Graham Collier Septet 
 Deep Dark Blue Center (1967) - Karl Jenkins: Baritone saxophone. With John Marshall on drums, future Soft Machine.

 The Graham Collier Sextet 
 Down Another Road (1969) Piano, oboe. Karl composed Lullaby For A Lonely Child, John Marshall on drums.

 Compilations 
 Workpoints (2005) - Karl, soprano and baritone sax
 Deep Dark Blue Centre / Portraits / The Alternate Mosaics (2008) 2 CD - With Alan Wakeman, John Marshall, Harold Beckett, Kenny Wheeler. 
 Relook : Graham Collier 1937-2011: A Memorial 75th Birthday Celebration (2012) With John Marshall, Nick Evans, Gary Burton, Frank Ricotti, Roy Babbington, Kenny Wheeler, Alan Wakeman etc. 

 With Neil Ardley – Don Rendell – Ian Carr 
 Greek Variations & Other Aegean Exercises (1970) - With Jack Bruce, Jeff Clyne, Roy Babbington, John Marshall, Barbara Thompson, etc.

 With Tim Rice and Andrew Lloyd Webber 
 Jesus Christ Superstar - (1970) - Starring John Marshall, Ian Gillan, Murray Head, J. Peter Robinson, Chris Spedding, etc.

 With Nucleus 
 Nucleus 
 Elastic Rock (1970) - Chris Spedding on guitar, John Marshall on drums, album cover by Roger Dean.
 We'll Talk About It Later (1971) 

 Ian Carr with Nucleus  
 Solar Plexus (1971) 

 Compilation 
 Direct Hits (1976) 
 Elastic Rock / We'll Talk About It Later (1994) 2 CD
 Solar Plexus / Belladonna (2002) 2 CD
 Alleycat / Direct Hits (2004) 2 CD

 With Elton John 
 Tumbleweed Connection (1970) - Oboe on Come Down in Time. 

 With The Chitinous Ensemble 
 Chitinous (1971) - With Paul Buckmaster, Nucleus, Ian Carr, etc.

 With Barry Guy/The London Jazz Composers' Orchestra 
 Ode (1972) - Karl Oboe and soprano and baritone sax Marc Charig on bugle, Alan Wakeman on tenor and soprano saxes, future Soft Machine and cousin of Rick Wakeman.

 With Soft Machine 
 Albums studio 
 Six (1973) - Karl keyboards and horns, Mike Ratledge keyboards, Hugh Hopper bass, John Marshall drums
 Seven (1973) - Same except Roy Babbington replaced Hopper on bass. 
 Bundles (1975) - Allan Holdsworth on guitar. Last album on guitar. Last album with Mike Ratledge.
 Softs (1976) - Alan Wakeman on saxes. Karl only plays keyboards.
 Rubber Riff (1976) - Originally an album for libraries providing "modern rock music featuring keyboards and guitar" composed by Karl Jenkins. Reissued as "Soft Machine" or "Karl Jenkins's Soft Machine".
 Land of Cockayne (1981) - Latest Soft Machine album of that era: Karl keyboards, John Taylor electric piano Fender Rhodes, Allan Holdsworth and Alan Parker guitars, Jack Bruce bass, Ray Warleigh sax and flute, Dick Morrissey tenor sax, John Marshall drums + backing vocals.

 Live albums  
 Alive & Well: Recorded in Paris (1978) - Karl keyboards, John Etheridge guitar, Steve Cook bass, John Marshall drums, Rick Sanders violin.
 BBC Radio 1971 - 1974 (2003) 
 British Tour '75 (2005) 
 Floating World Live (2006) - Recorded in 1975 on Radio Brennen in Germany.
 NDR Jazz Workshop (2010) CD + DVD
 Switzerland 1974 (2015) CD + DVD

 Compilations 
 Triple Echo (1977) - Available on vinyl on a triple album. Karl on the last 4 pieces.
 The Untouchable (1990) 
 As If... (1991) - Contains songs from the  Third ,  Fourth ,  Fifth  &  Sixth  albums.
 Softs / Alive And Well (Recorded In Paris) / Bundles (1992) - 3 CD 
 The Best Of Soft Machine - The Harvest Years (1995) 
 De Wolfe Sessions (2002) - Presented as Karl Jenkins' Soft Machine. 
 MP3 Collection (2003) - Contains albums Volume One (The Soft Machine) to Rubber Riff  + At the beginning https://www.discogs.com/fr/Soft-Machine-MP3-Collection/release/7018262
 Six + Seven (2004) - 2 CD 
 Out-Bloody-Rageous An Anthology 1967-1973 (2005) - 2 CD 
 Tales Of Taliesin (The EMI Years Anthology 1975-1981) (2010) - 2 CD 
 Original Album Classics (2010) - Contains albums from Third to Seven.

 With Mike Oldfield 
 Tubular Bells - BBC 1973 - Recorded live in studio for the BBC in November 1973 and released in 1993. Available on DVD Elements - The Best of Mike Oldfield. 
 Music of the spheres (2008) - Karl Jenkins; orchestrations, string direction and production.

 With Planet Earth 
 Planet Earth - Avec Mike Ratledge, Tristan Fry, etc. (1978)

 With Plaza 
 Plaza - With Mike Thorne and Mike Ratledge. (1979)

 With Rollercoaster 
 Wonderin' - With Mike Ratledge, Dick Morrisey, Ray Warleigh, etc. (1980)

 With Mike Ratledge 
 Cuts For Commercials Volume 3 (1981) 
 For Christmas, For Children (1981) 
 Movement  (2010) 
 Some Shufflin' (2010)

 With JAR 
 Only You/Ballad From An Unmade Movie - Single from The Projet Jenkins Aspery Ratledge, JAR (1988)

 With Kiri Te Kanawa 
 Kiri Sings Karl (2006) - Karl orchestration and production.

 Adiemus 

 Studio albums 
 Adiemus: Songs of Sanctuary (1995) - With Mike Ratledge on drums programming and production.
 Adiemus II: Cantata Mundi  (1997)
 Adiemus III: Dances of Time (1998)
 Adiemus IV: The Eternal Knot (2001) 
 Adiemus Live (2001) 
 Adiemus V: Vocalise (2003) 
 Adiemus Colores (2013) 
 Symphonic Adiemus (2017)

 Compilations 

 Diamond Music (1996) - Karl Jenkins/The London Philharmonic/The Smith Quartet.
 The Best Of Adiemus - The Journey (1999)
 The Essential Collection (2006) 
 The Very Best of Karl Jenkins (2011) - 2 CD
 Adiemus The Collection (2013) - Coffret 6 CD
 Still With The Music (The Album) (2015) 
 Voices - 8-CD boxset including the premiere of The Healer – A Cantata for St Luke. (2015)
 The Very Best of Karl Jenkins (2019)

 Film score 
 River Queen - Original Motion Picture Soundtrack (2007)

 Other works 
 Nomination (1976) - Karl Jenkins/Peter Milray 
 Topsy Turvy (1986) - Karl Jenkins/Jack Trombey
 Merry Christmas to the World (1995) - Collection of traditional Christmas carols orchestrated by Karl Jenkins (In Adiemus Style).
 Palladio (1996)
 Eloise (1997) - Opéra
 Imagined Oceans (1998)
 New Music From Karl Jenkins (1998) - Sampler.
 Harmonia - Le Chant Des Rêves (1998) - Compilation with Mike Oldfield et Vangelis.
 Dewi Sant (1999)
 The Armed Man: A Mass for Peace (1999)
 Over the Stone (2002) - Concerto for two harps.
 Crossing the Stone (2003)
 Ave Verum (2004)
 Quirk (2004)
 La Folia (2004)
 In These Stones Horizons Sing (2004)
 Requiem (2005)
 River Queen (2005) - Original film score River Queen by New Zealand director Vincent Ward.
 Tlep (2006)
 This Land of Ours (2007) - With Cory Band and Cantorion 
 Sarikiz (2008)
 Stabat Mater (2008)
 Quirk - The Concertos (2008) - This album is a Compilation of Concertos by the composer that were previously commercially unavailable.  These are: "Over the Stone" (2002), La Folia (2004), Quirk (2004) and also includes new concerto "Sarikiz" (2008).
 Stella Natalis (2009)
 Gloria / Te Deum (2010) - With Hayley Westenra
 The Bards of Wales (2011) 
 Motets (2014)
 Cantata Memoria (2016) - In tribute to the victims (116 children and 28 adults) of the Aberfan disaster, on October 21, 1966.
 Songs Of Mercy And Redemption  (2019) 
 Piano'' (2019)

See also 
List of ambient music artists

References

External links

Biography at Calyx (Canterbury music website)
Karl Jenkins on MySpace
Karl Jenkins biography from BBC Wales
Karl Jenkins interview
Karl Jenkins' life in pictures on Classic FM

 
1944 births
20th-century classical composers
20th-century jazz composers
21st-century classical composers
21st-century jazz composers
Academics of the University of Glamorgan
Alumni of Cardiff University
Alumni of the Royal Academy of Music
Ambient composers
Commanders of the Order of the British Empire
Canterbury scene
Caroline Records artists
Centipede (band) members
Choral composers
Composers awarded knighthoods
Deutsche Grammophon artists
EMI Classics and Virgin Classics artists
Knights Bachelor
Living people
Male jazz composers
Male oboists
Male opera composers
New-age composers
Nucleus (band) members
People educated at Gowerton Grammar School
People from the Gower Peninsula
Soft Machine members
Virgin Records artists
Welsh classical composers
Welsh jazz composers
Welsh male classical composers
Welsh multi-instrumentalists
Welsh oboists
Welsh opera composers